Manca may refer to:

People
 Francesco Manca (born 1966), Italian amateur astronomer.
 Manca Izmajlova, Slovenian opera singer.
 Pietrino Manca (died 2001), Italian physicist.

Other
 Franco Manca, a sourdough pizza business.
 Manca, the post-larval juvenile in some crustaceans.